Rodney George Laver  (born 9 August 1938) is an Australian former tennis player. Laver was the world number 1 ranked professional in some sources in 1964, in all sources from 1965 to 1969 and in some sources in 1970, spanning four years before and three years after the start of the Open Era in 1968. He was also ranked the world number 1 amateur in 1961 by Lance Tingay and 1962 by Tingay and Ned Potter. Laver's 200 singles titles are the most in tennis history. This included his all-time men's record of 10 or more titles per year for seven consecutive years (1964–1970). He excelled on all of the court surfaces of his time: grass, clay, hard, carpet, wood.

Laver won 11 Grand Slam singles titles, though he was banned from playing those tournaments for the five years prior to the Open Era. Laver is the only player, male or female, to win the Grand Slam (winning all four major titles in the same calendar year) twice in singles, in 1962 and 1969; the latter remains the only time a man has done so in the Open Era. He is the first male player out of two to be winner and runner up at all four grand slams, followed by Roger Federer. He is the second of four male players to win each major title twice (preceded by Roy Emerson and followed by Novak Djokovic and Rafael Nadal). Laver also won 8 Pro Slam titles, including the "pro Grand Slam" in 1967, and he contributed to five Davis Cup titles for Australia during an age when the Davis Cup was deemed as significant as the four majors.The Laver Cup tournament and the Rod Laver Arena are named after him.

Personal life
Rodney George Laver was born in Rockhampton, Queensland, Australia, on 9 August 1938. He was the third of four children of Roy Laver, a cattleman and butcher, and his wife Melba Roffey. Relatives include the cricketers Frank Laver and Jack Laver.

In 1966, Laver, aged 27, married Mary Benson in San Rafael, California. Born Mary Shelby Peterson in Illinois, she was a divorcee with three children. After their wedding ceremony, a group of well-known tennis players in attendance, including Lew Hoad, Ken Rosewall, Roy Emerson, Mal Anderson and Barry MacKay, stood outside the church with raised tennis rackets that formed an archway for the newlyweds to walk under. Laver and Mary had a son and the family lived at various locations in California including Rancho Mirage, Corona del Mar, a ranch near Santa Barbara and Carlsbad.
Mary Laver died in November 2012 at the age of 84 at their home in Carlsbad.

Career

Amateur (1956–62) 
Laver was a teenager when he left school to pursue a tennis career that lasted 24 years. He was coached in Queensland by Charlie Hollis and later by the Australian Davis Cup team captain Harry Hopman, who gave Laver the nickname "Rocket".

Laver was both Australian and US Junior champion in 1957. He had his breakthrough on the world stage in 1959, when he reached all three finals at Wimbledon, winning the mixed doubles title with Darlene Hard. As an unseeded player, he lost the singles final to Peruvian Alex Olmedo after surviving an 87-game semifinal against American Barry MacKay. His first major singles title was the Australian Championships in 1960, where he defeated fellow Australian Neale Fraser in a five-set final after coming back from two sets down and saving a Fraser championship point in the fourth set. Laver captured his first Wimbledon singles crown in 1961 beating Chuck McKinley in straight sets in the final, which lasted just 53 minutes (one of the shortest men's singles Wimbledon finals on record). Laver was ranked the world No. 1 amateur in 1961 by Lance Tingay.

In 1962, Laver became the first male player since Don Budge in 1938 to win all four Grand Slam singles titles in the same year. He won an additional 18 titles, for a season total of 22. Among those titles were the Italian Championships and the German Championships, giving Laver the "clay court triple" of Paris, Rome, and Hamburg that had been achieved previously only by Lew Hoad in 1956. At the Australian championships, Laver beat Roy Emerson in the final. The biggest hurdle to Laver's winning the Grand Slam was the French Championships on slow clay, where Laver won three consecutive five-setters beginning with the quarterfinals. In his quarterfinal with Martin Mulligan, Laver saved a matchpoint in the fourth set with a backhand volley after coming to the net behind a second serve. In the final, Laver lost the first two sets and was down 0–3 in the fourth set before coming back to defeat Emerson. At Wimbledon, his progress was much easier. Laver lost only one set the whole tournament, to Manuel Santana in a quarterfinal, who held a set point for a two set lead. In the final, Laver beat Mulligan in 52 minutes (a minute shorter than the previous year's final). At the US Championships, Laver lost only two sets during the tournament and defeated Emerson again in the final. Laver was ranked world number one amateur for 1962 by Tingay, by Ned Potter and by an Ulrich Kaiser panel of 13 experts.

In February 1963, he appeared on the panel game show To Tell the Truth, where all four panelists identified him based on his knowledge of the history of tennis.

Professional

Before the Open Era (1963–68) 
In December 1962 Laver turned professional after winning the Davis Cup with the Australian team. After an initial period of adjustment he quickly established himself among the leading professional players such as Ken Rosewall, Lew Hoad and Andrés Gimeno, and also Pancho Gonzales when Gonzales returned to a full-time schedule in 1964. During the next seven years, Laver won the U.S. Pro Tennis Championships five times, including four in a row beginning in 1966.

In the beginning of 1963, Laver was beaten consistently by both Rosewall and Hoad on an Australasian tour. Hoad won the first eight matches against Laver, and Rosewall won 11 out of 13. However, Laver won the best-of-five set matches against Rosewall at Kooyong Stadium and at Adelaide's Memorial Stadium. By the end of the year, with six tournament titles, Laver had become the No. 2 professional player behind Rosewall. In the first phase of the World Series tour, Laver finished second, with a 25–16 record. The top two players Rosewall and Laver then played a series of matches against each other to determine the champion. Rosewall won 14–4.

Laver's gross earnings for 1963 were first among the pro players.

In 1964, Laver and Rosewall both won seven important titles (in minor tournaments Laver won four and Rosewall won three), but Laver won 17 of 24 matches against Rosewall and captured the two most prestigious titles, the US Pro Championships over Gonzales and the Wembley Championships over Rosewall. In Tennis Week, Raymond Lee described the Wembley match, where Laver came from 5–3 down in the fifth set to win 8–6, as possibly their best ever and one that changed tennis history. Lee regards this win as the one that began and established Laver's long reign as world number one. The other prestige title, the French pro, was won by Rosewall. Rosewall finished top of the official points table in 1964 and after winning at Wembley, Laver said "I’ve still plenty of ambitions left and would like to be the world's No. 1. Despite this win, I am not there yet – Ken is."

In 1965, Laver was clearly the No. 1 professional player, winning 17 titles and 13 of 18 matches against Rosewall. In ten finals, Laver won eight against the still dangerous Gonzales. Laver won the Wembley Pro, beating Gimeno in the final.

In 1966, Laver won 16 events, including the US Pro Championships (beating Rosewall in a five-set final), the Wembley Pro Championship (beating Rosewall easily in the final), and eight other important tournaments.

In 1967, Laver won 19 titles, including the Wimbledon Pro (beating Rosewall in straight sets in the final), the US Pro Championships (beating Gimeno in the final), the Wembley Pro Championships (beating Rosewall in the final), and the French Pro Championship (beating Gimeno in the final), which gave him a clean sweep of the four most important professional titles, a professional Grand Slam. The Wimbledon Pro tournament in 1967 was the only professional event ever staged on Wimbledon's Centre Court before the Open Era began.

During the Open Era (1968–76) 
With the dawn of the Open Era in 1968, professional players were once again allowed to compete in Grand Slam events. Laver became Wimbledon's first Open Era champion in 1968, beating the best amateur, American Arthur Ashe, in a semifinal and fellow-Australian Tony Roche in the final, both in straight sets. Laver was also the runner-up to Ken Rosewall in the first French Open. In this first "open" year, there were only eight open events besides Wimbledon and the French Open, where professionals, registered players, and amateurs could compete against each other. The professionals mainly played their own circuit, with two groups – National Tennis League (NTL) and World Championships Tennis (WCT) – operating. Laver was ranked No. 1 universally, winning the US Professional Championships on grass and the French Pro Championship on clay (both over John Newcombe). Laver also won the last big open event of the year, the Pacific Southwest in Los Angeles on hard courts. Ashe regarded Laver's 4–6, 6–0, 6–0 final win over Ken Rosewall as one of his finest performances. Laver's post-match comment was, "This is the kind of match you always dream about. The kind you play at night in your sleep." Laver ranked No. 1 for 1968 by the panel of journalists for the 'Martini and Rossi' Award, by an Ulrich Kaiser panel of 18 experts, by Seagrams (a panel of 15 journalists), by World Tennis, by Lance Tingay, by Rino Tommasi, by Bud Collins and by The Times.

In 1969, Laver won all four Grand Slam tournaments in the same calendar year for the second time, sealing the achievement with a four-set win over Roche in the US Open final. He won 18 of the 32 singles tournaments he entered (still the Open Era titles record) and compiled a 106–16 win–loss record. In beating Newcombe in four sets in the Wimbledon final, he captured the title at the All England Club for the fourth consecutive time that he had entered the tournament (and reached the final for the sixth consecutive time as he had been runner-up in 1959 and 1960). He set a record of 31 consecutive match victories at Wimbledon between 1961 and 1970, which lasted until 1980 when it was eclipsed by Björn Borg. Unlike his first Grand Slam year in 1962, Laver in 1969 played in events open to all the best professional and amateur players of the world. In the year's Grand Slam tournaments, Laver had five five-set-matches, twice coming back from two sets down in early rounds. In the four finals, however, he lost a total of only two sets. His hardest match was a marathon 90-game semifinal against Roche at the Australian Open under tropical hot conditions. Other opponents at the Australian Open included Roy Emerson, Fred Stolle, and Andrés Gimeno. At the French Open, Laver beat Gimeno, Tom Okker, and Rosewall. At Wimbledon, Laver overcame strong challenges from Stan Smith, Cliff Drysdale, Ashe, and Newcombe. At the US Open on slippery grass courts, he defeated Dennis Ralston, Emerson, Ashe, and Roche. Laver proved his versatility by winning the Grand Slam tournaments on grass and clay, plus the two most important hard court titles (South African Open at Ellis Park, Johannesburg and the US Professional Championships at Boston) and the leading indoor tournaments (Philadelphia US Pro Indoor and Wembley British Indoor). Laver ranked No. 1 for 1969 by the panel of 13 international journalists for the 'Martini and Rossi' Award, by Tingay, by Collins, by Tommasi, by Frank Rostron and by World Tennis.

In the early 1970s, Laver lost his grip on the major tournaments. He played only five Grand Slam tournaments from 1970 through 1972. This was partly because of his contracts with NTL and WCT. But on the WCT tours, he remained the leading player and by far the leading prize money winner.

In 1970, Laver won 15 titles and US$201,453 in prize money, including the rich "Tennis Champions Classic" and five other big events (Sydney Dunlop Open, Philadelphia, Wembley, Los Angeles, South African Open). Those were the equivalent of the modern day ATP Masters Series and most had 8 or more of the world's top ranked players participating. With only two majors played by all the best players (Wimbledon and the US Open), there was no clear-cut World No. 1 in 1970. Wimbledon champion Newcombe, US champion Rosewall, and Laver (who won the most titles and had a 3–0 win–loss record against Newcombe and a 5–0 record against Rosewall) were ranked the highest by different journalists and expert panels.  The panel of 10 international journalists who voted for the 'Martini and Rossi' Award, ranked Rosewall No. 1 with 97 points over Laver (89 pts) and Newcombe (81 pts). The panel of 12 journalists which made the WCT draw for 1971 ranked Laver 1st, Rosewall 2nd and Newcombe 3rd. Rex Bellamy ranked Laver No. 1, with Rosewall No. 2. Judith Elian of L'Equipe Magazine (Paris) and Rino Tommasi placed Rosewall No. 1, while Robert Geist co-ranked Rosewall, Laver and Newcombe No. 1.  Newcombe later wrote in his autobiography "Newk-Life On and Off the Court" (2002) that the top honour for 1970 belonged to Laver. Lance Tingay, John McCauley and Bud Collins. ranked Newcombe ahead of Rosewall and Laver.

In 1971 Laver won seven titles, including the Italian Open in Rome on clay over Jan Kodeš, the reigning French Open champion. Laver successfully defended his title at the "Tennis Champions Classic", winning 13 consecutive winner-take-all matches against top opponents and US$160,000. For the year, Laver won a then-record US$292,717 in tournament prize money and became the first tennis player to surpass US$1 million in career prize money. In 1971 and 1972, Laver finished as the points leader of the WCT tournament series but lost the playoff finals at Dallas to Rosewall. The last match is rated as one of the best of all time and drew a TV audience of over 20 million.

In 1972, Laver cut back his tournament schedule, partly because of back and knee injuries and his tennis camp businesses, but he still won five titles that year. In 1973, Laver won seven titles and successfully participated in the semifinals and final of the Davis Cup, where he won all six of his rubbers for Australia. In 1974 Laver won six titles from 13 tournaments and ended the year as World No. 4 based on the ATP point system. At 36, he was the oldest player during the Open Era to have been included in the year-ending top five.

In 1975, Laver set a record for WCT tournaments by winning four titles and 23 consecutive matches but in 1976, he semi-retired from the main tour, playing only a few selected events. He also signed with World Team Tennis, where he became "Rookie of the Year" at the age of 38 but won five titles overall that season.

Overall, despite turning 30 just months after the Open Era began, Laver had tremendous success, winning 74 singles titles, which remains seventh most of the era. Plus, like most players of his day, he regularly played doubles, winning 37 titles.

Laver's career earnings were approximately $1,540,000.

Rivalries 

Laver had a long-running, friendly rivalry with Ken Rosewall between 1963, when he started out as a pro, and 1976, when both were semi-retired from the main tour. Including tournaments and one-night stands, they played over 130 matches, all of them as professionals, with some results from the barnstorming pro tours lost or badly recorded. Overall a match score of 89–75 in favour of Laver can be documented.

Against the older Pancho Gonzales, whom he played 1964 to 1970 on the pro tour, Laver had a lead of 43–22.

Laver had another, even longer rivalry with his fellow Queenslander Roy Emerson. They met first on the senior amateur tour in 1958 and dominated the amateur circuit until 1962, before Laver turned pro. When open tennis arrived in 1968, Emerson joined the pro tour, and had many new battles with Laver. Overall the score is 49–18 in favour of Laver, with 7–2 in major Grand Slam tournaments.

Laver had also many battles with Lew Hoad in his first years on the pro circuit 1963–1966. Although he lost the first eight matches in January 1963, Laver later in the year began to turn around their rivalry, and until 1966, he had built a 38–21 lead. Against Arthur Ashe, Laver had a head-to-head lead of 21–3, winning all of the first 18 matches. Ashe's first win came in 1974, when Laver was 35. Another younger rival in the Open Era was John Newcombe, whom Laver led 16–5 in their head-to-head score.

Davis Cup 
Laver helped Australia win the Davis Cup four consecutive times from 1959 to 1962. In 1973, professionals were permitted to play in the Davis Cup for the first time, and Laver was on a winning team for the fifth time, claiming two singles and a doubles rubber in the final as Australia beat the United States 5–0. Australia were crowned Davis Cup champions in each of the five seasons Laver played in the competition. Laver won 16 out of 20 Davis Cup singles matches and all four of his doubles.

Playing style 

Although of average height and medium build (1.73 m/5 ft 8"), Laver developed a technically complete serve-and-volley game, with aggressive groundstrokes to back it up. Commentator Dan Maskell described him as "technically faultless". His left-handed serve was well disguised and wide swinging. His groundstrokes on both flanks were hit with topspin, as was the attacking topspin lob, which Laver developed into a weapon. His stroke technique was based on quick shoulder turns, true swings, and accurate timing. His backhand, often hit on the run, was a point-ender that gave him an advantage. Laver was very quick and had a strong left forearm. Rex Bellamy wrote, "The strength of that wrist and forearm gave him blazing power without loss of control, even when he was on the run and at full stretch. The combination of speed and strength, especially wrist strength, enabled him to hit ferocious winners when way out of court."  At the net, he had forcing volleys, often hit as stroke volleys. Especially on the backhand, he could hit sharp underspin angles as well.  He was difficult to lob, because of his springing agility, and when forced to retreat, he could come up with a vicious counterpunch.

As an amateur, Laver was a somewhat flashy player, often a late starter. He had to learn to control his adventurous shot-making and integrate percentage tennis into his game when he turned professional. In his prime, he could adapt his style to all surfaces and to all conditions. Laver had a strong record in five-set-matches, often turning things around with subtle changes of tactics.

Tennis legacy 

Laver is widely regarded as one of the greatest tennis players in the history of the sport. Laver was ranked the world No. 1 amateur in 1961 by Lance Tingay and in 1962 by Tingay and Ned Potter. Laver was the number one professional in some rankings in 1964, in all rankings from 1965 to 1969 and in some rankings in 1970.

Jack Kramer, the long-time tennis promoter, ranked Laver only in the "second echelon" of great players, just behind the six best. He writes that although Laver was "absolutely unbeatable for a year or two late in the 1960s", a "careful comparison" could be made between Laver and the somewhat older Gonzales and that Kramer is "positive that Gonzales could have beaten Laver regularly." Kramer's main argument for downgrading Laver is that, "Ken Rosewall beat Laver in those two World Championship of Tennis finals and that was a title Laver really wanted." Kramer sees as evidence of Gonzales' superiority over Laver the fact that Gonzales defeated Laver in a  five-set match before 15,000 spectators in New York City's Madison Square Garden in January 1970, when Gonzales was 41 years old and Laver was still considered the World No. 1 player. On the other hand, Gonzales was still a top ten player when this match took place and Laver subsequently won this event, beating Gonzales in a straight-sets semifinal. Overall, his head-to-head-record with Gonzales was either 35–19 or 38–21 in favour of Laver, depending on the source. Laver was 12–5 against Gonzales during the Open Era, although Gonzales was then in his late thirties. 

In 1975, Don Budge ranked his top five players of all time and rated Laver number five behind Vines, Kramer, Perry and Tilden. 

In 1978, Ellsworth Vines ranked his all time top 10 in Tennis Myth and Method and rated Laver number four behind Budge, Kramer and Gonzales.

In the early years of the 21st century, Sidney Wood compiled his list of the Greatest Players of All Time (later published posthumously in a memoir "The Wimbledon final that never was and other tennis tales from a bygone era").  Wood first entered Wimbledon in 1927 and won the title in 1931.  "From that time on, through to the late 1970s (doubles only towards the end), I was privileged to compete against virtually every top player in the world" said Wood.  Wood ranked Laver number five, behind Budge, Kramer, Tilden and Gonzales.

In 2014, Frank Sedgman ranked Laver number three, behind Jack Kramer and Roger Federer, in his greatest male tennis players of all time list in his autobiography 'Game, Sedge and Match'. 

Many experts disagree with Kramer's assessment of Laver. For example, Dan Maskell, John Barrett, Butch Buchholz, Cliff Drysdale, Joe McCauley, Ted Schroeder, and Tony Trabert rank Laver as the best of all time. Schroeder has been quoted by Alan Trengove as saying, "You take all the criteria – longevity, playing on grass and clay, amateur, professional, his behaviour, his appearance – in all criteria, Laver's the best player of all time." Trabert said in January 2008, "I still maintain that Rod Laver is the best player who ever played the game because he's done something no one has ever done in the 120 or 140-year history of our sport: he won the Grand Slam as an amateur and he won the Grand Slam as a pro. If someone in some other sport held a world record no one else had, you would say that person was the best in that sport. So in my view, you've got to say Laver is the best player of all time." Similarly, the tennis author Peter Bodo wrote in May 2008, "Give him credit? Shoot, the only real issue is whether the GOAT [Greatest of All Time] argument is a debate at all, given that posting those two Slams puts Laver in a league of his own." Other experts cite the fact that during his amateur, touring professional, and Open Era careers, Laver won a record 184 singles titles. He also holds the record for most titles won in a single year during the amateur era (22 in 1962), during the touring pro era (19 in 1967), and during the Open Era (18 in 1969). After turning professional in 1963, Laver won the U.S. Pro Tennis Championships five times and the Wembley Pro Championship four times from 1964 to 1967. In 1967, Laver won a "Professional Grand Slam" by winning all four of the major professional tournaments: the US Pro Championships, the Wembley Pro Championships, the French Pro Championship, and the Wimbledon Pro.

In 1983, Fred Perry ranked the greatest male players of all time and put them in to two categories, before World War 2 and after.  Perry ranked Laver number one in the post-World War 2 list.

Laver came out on top in various experts polls for the best of all time. In 1986, the US magazine Inside Tennis polled 37 experts, which resulted in a computerised tournament. Laver ranked first on this list ahead of John McEnroe, Don Budge, Kramer, Björn Borg, Gonzales, Tilden, Jimmy Connors, Fred Perry, and Lew Hoad. In a poll by the Associated Press in 2000, Laver was voted "The Male Tennis Player of the Century", ahead of Pete Sampras, Tilden, Borg, Budge, McEnroe and Hoad (tied), Rosewall and Roy Emerson (tied), and Kramer. In an article in Tennis Week in 2007, the tennis historian Raymond Lee statistically analysed the all-time best players. Laver topped his list ahead of Tilden and Borg (tied), Roger Federer, Gonzales, Rosewall, Budge, Ivan Lendl, Connors, Sampras, McEnroe, and Kramer. In 2009 it was written that Rod Laver "is considered by most folks who saw him play and many who've heard of his accomplishments, to be as great a tennis player that ever lived—current players included.". In July 2017, tennis player Roger Federer called Rod Laver the greatest of all-time.

In 1989, Bud Collins wrote, "I remain unconvinced that there ever was a better player than Rod Laver". Thirteen years later, however, as editor of the "Total Tennis, The Ultimate Tennis Encyclopedia", Collins was more guarded. He wrote that Laver would "be known as possibly the greatest player ever", but also said that Gonzales was "probably as good as anyone who ever played the game, if not better"—and called Tilden "perhaps the greatest player of them all". In an August 2006 article for MSNBC, Collins ranked Laver as one of the five top men's tennis stars of all time, along with Tilden, Gonzales, Borg, and Sampras. He pointed to Tilden's "phenomenal .938 winning percentage", and said "If I had to choose someone to play for my life it would be Pancho Gonzalez", praised Borg's uncanny transition from the French Open to Wimbledon, cited Sampras's "assault on the citadels of the past", and called Laver "in my eyes, the greatest player ever".

In 1973, the ATP's computer rankings were established. Laver attained his highest ranking on that computer of World No. 3 in 1974. Laver's highest year-end ranking by the ATP was World No. 4 in 1974. Laver semi-retired from the main professional tennis tour in 1975 while still being ranked in the top 10. In terms of yearly prize money won, Laver was the leader from 1964 until 1971. The number of tournament singles titles that Laver won during his career varies depending on the source. The ATP credits Laver with 72 Open Era titles while "Total Tennis: The Ultimate Tennis Encyclopedia" (edited by Bud Collins), give him 47 or 54 titles during the Open Era. Collins credits him with 184 titles in amateur, professional, and open competition, without listing them in detail.

Laver's eleven Grand Slam singles titles currently place him tied with Borg for sixth place on the all-time list. Among his contemporaries, only Emerson won more Grand Slam singles titles during his career (12 to Laver's 11), though more recently Federer, Nadal, Sampras, and Djokovic have surpassed this number. Laver also won eight Major doubles titles. Laver is the only player to have twice won all four Grand Slam singles tournaments during the same calendar year – the Australian Open, US Open, and Wimbledon. Because none of the Majors were played on hardcourts in Laver's era, he never won a Grand Slam tournament on that surface. The tennis landscape today is different as half of the year's Majors are played on hardcourts. Only six players have won Major titles on clay, grass and hardcourts: Jimmy Connors, Mats Wilander, Andre Agassi, Roger Federer, Rafael Nadal and Novak Djokovic. Federer, Nadal and Djokovic are the only players in history to have simultaneously held Grand Slam tournament titles on the three surfaces.

Previous observations change substantially if we also consider professional grand slam majors, which were played on two different surfaces in the 1963-67 period (grass and wood/parquet), and wherein Laver, like Rosewall, excelled. Furthermore, the ATP Performance Zone website lists his (partial) career win/loss percentage on hardcourt as .813, on carpet as .766, on grass as .827 and on clay as .764.

Laver was unable to compete in the Grand Slam tournaments during his professional career between 1963 and 1968 and it is argued he would likely have won more titles had he been able to do so. Sports columnist Malcolm Knox of the Sydney Morning Herald assesses the effect of Laver's ban on competing in Grand Slams. He states: "..if grand slams are taken as the benchmark, consider this. Laver won 11 of the 16 grand slam titles he contested in his prime. The pro tour put him out of 20 grand slams from age 23 to 28". Based on this he puts Laver and Rosewall in "a class of two".

Honours 
The hall at the Rockhampton Tennis Association's Victoria Park precinct in Wandal where Laver competed until the age of 14 was named the Rod Laver Hall upon its completion in December 1963 in recognition of his Grand Slam win the previous year.

In 1969, Laver was awarded the ABC Sportsman of the Year Award and the BBC Overseas Sports Personality of the Year. He was inducted into the International Tennis Hall of Fame in 1981. He was inducted into the Sport Australia Hall of Fame in 1985 and upgraded to a Legend of Australian Sport in 2002. He is also an Australian Living Treasure. In 1998, Laver received the Philippe Chatrier Award (the ITF's highest accolade) for his contributions to tennis and in 2000, Centre Court at the National Tennis Centre in Melbourne was renamed Rod Laver Arena.

Laver was named as a Queensland Great in June 2005. In 2009, he was inducted into the Queensland Sport Hall of Fame. Also in 2009, as part of the Q150 celebrations, Laver was named one of the Q150 Icons of Queensland.

Bronze busts of Laver and Margaret Court by sculptor Barbara McLean were unveiled at Melbourne Park in 1993 upon their induction into the Australian Tennis Hall of Fame. Another bronze bust of Laver, also by McLean, was installed on the banks of the Fitzroy River in Rockhampton's city centre which was unveiled by Laver and Rockhampton City Council deputy mayor Dell Bunt on 7 December 2002. There was some concern raised by the local community when the bust was removed in 2016 during the riverbank redevelopment. However, the bust was re-installed upon the completion of the redevelopment which was officially opened in 2018, with the recreational precinct on the low bank being named Rod Laver Plaza. A bronze statue of Laver by sculptor Lis Johnson was unveiled at Melbourne Park prior to the 2017 Australian Open.

Post-retirement 
On 27 July 1998, Laver suffered a stroke while being interviewed by ESPN-TV in the United States for their SportsCentury 20th Century sports retrospective series. He was hospitalised for a month and suffered from memory and speech difficulties after the stroke, but recovered over the course of the following year. In 2000, the centre court at Melbourne Park, which today hosts the Australian Open, was named the Rod Laver Arena in his honour. In 2003, Laver, along with his fellow Australian tennis superstar Margaret Court, was honoured with his portrait on a postage stamp by the "Australia Post Australian Legends Award".

Laver returned to his native country to present Roger Federer in 2006 and 2017, Rafael Nadal in 2009, and Novak Djokovic in 2012, the Norman Brookes Challenge Cup, which is awarded to the Men's Singles winner of the Australian Open. He was present at Wimbledon to witness Federer make tennis history, when he surpassed Pete Sampras' record by winning his 15th Grand Slam Title.

After the short-lived reintroduction of knighthoods in Australia in 2014, there were calls for Laver to be knighted within the Order of Australia. In 2016 he was appointed a Companion of the Order of Australia, by which time knighthoods had again been abolished and the Companion was the highest honour available in the Order.

Laver resides in Carlsbad, California, and attended San Diego Chargers games on occasion. On October 1, 2017, he was inducted into the Southern California Tennis Hall of Fame.

Performance timeline 

Laver joined the professional tennis circuit in 1963 and as a consequence was banned from competing in the amateur Grand Slams until the start of the Open Era at the 1968 French Open.

Career statistics and records

All-time tournament records 
 Records in bold indicate peerless achievements.
 Combined tours: NTL, WCT and Grand Prix

Notes on sources: John Bercow's book Tennis Maestros: The Twenty Greatest Male Tennis Players of All Time confirms in chapter 9 Rod Laver's titles for the following years 1962 (22), 1965 (17), 1966 (16), 1967 (19), 1970 (15), 1971 (7), 1972 (5), 1973 (7), 1974 (6). The ITF confirms titles in 1975 (5) titles.

Open Era records

See also 

 All-time tennis records – men's singles
 Open Era tennis records – men's singles

Notes

References

Sources 

 
 
 Bercow, John (2014). Tennis Maestros: The Twenty Greatest Male Tennis Players of All Time, Biteback Publishing, ASIN: B00KPSCV40
 Bellamy, Rex (1990). Love Thirty. Three Decades of Champions.
 
 
 
 
 
 Heldman, Julius. The Style of Rod Laver. In 
 
 
 Newcombe, John; Writer, Larry (2002). Newk – Life on and Off the Court.
 Sutter, Michel (1992). Vainqueurs-Winners 1946–1991 (forewords by Arthur Ashe and Mark Miles).
 Trengove, Alan (2003). Advantage Australia. Rod Laver and Margaret Court: Legends of the Grand Slam.

External links 

 
 
 
 
 
 
 Official Wimbledon website profile
 BBC profile

Living people
1938 births
Australian Championships (tennis) champions
Australian Championships (tennis) junior champions
Australian Members of the Order of the British Empire
Australian male tennis players
Australian Open (tennis) champions
Companions of the Order of Australia
French Championships (tennis) champions
French Open champions
Grand Slam (tennis) champions in boys' singles
Grand Slam (tennis) champions in boys' doubles
Grand Slam (tennis) champions in men's doubles
Grand Slam (tennis) champions in men's singles
Grand Slam (tennis) champions in mixed doubles
International Tennis Hall of Fame inductees
People from Carlsbad, California
Professional tennis players before the Open Era
Queensland Greats
Recipients of the Australian Sports Medal
Sport Australia Hall of Fame inductees
Sportspeople from Rockhampton
Tennis people from Queensland
United States National champions (tennis)
US Open (tennis) champions
Wimbledon champions
Wimbledon champions (pre-Open Era)
World number 1 ranked male tennis players